Dasepo Naughty Girls (lit. "Dasepo Girl" or "Multi-cell Girl") is a 2006 South Korean musical comedy film. It is based on the popular webtoon Dasepo Girls by B-rate Dalgung (Chae Jeong-taek), which has also been adapted into a TV series.

Plot
The film takes place at Musseulmo High School (무쓸모고등학교 in Korean, literally "Useless High School"), situated somewhere in South Korea.

One of the students there is named "Poor Girl" (Kim Ok-bin). She walks around with a stuffed doll draped around her back, which she calls "Poverty." As her name implies, she comes from a very poor family. She lives with her mother (Im Ye-jin) in a one-room building. Her mother is chronically ill and buried in debt. To help pay for her mother's bills, Poor Girl has turned to prostitution to support her family. Because of this, she carries a heavy burden of guilt and shame, so much so that she has attempted suicide. Her only friend seems to be her doll, but then she meets and bonds with a new client.

The new client is a cross-dresser (Lee Won-jong), who's looking for a girl to play sisters with. Poor Girl is able to share some of her problems with her new-found friend. In the meantime, she dreams about dating her classmate Anthony (Park Jin-woo).

Anthony comes from a rich background. His adoptive parents are diplomats from Switzerland. Anthony goes through life as a materialistic, shallow person until he meets Double Eyes (Lee Eun-sung).

Double Eyes is the sister of Anthony's classmate Cyclops (Lee Kyeon) who is a social outcast at Museulmo High school. As his name indicates, he has only one eye. He is isolated due to his condition and is a constant target for pranks and jokes. While waiting for his sister Double Eyes at a restaurant, Cyclops is spotted by Anthony and his two friends. One of Anthony's friends asks Cyclops, "Does your sister have a third eye?" Anthony and his friends laugh until they see Cyclops's sister Double Eyes, who is beautiful. Anthony immediately falls in love with her. However, unbeknownst to Anthony, Double Eyes has a secret.

Meanwhile, students at the school begin behaving strangely. Kids who have never shown any interest in their education suddenly become immersed in studying and preparing for their college entrance exams, even giving up activities like dating.

Cast

 Kim Ok-bin ... Poor Girl
 Park Jin-woo ... Anthony
 Lee Kyeon ... Cyclops
 Yoo Gun ... Woo-su
 Kim Byul ... Bellflower
 Lee Min-hyuk ... Te-ri
 Nam Ho-jung ... Vice-President girl
 Park Hye-won ... Class monitor
 Im Ye-jin ... Poor Girl's mother
 Lee Eun-sung ... Double Eyes
 Lee Yong-joo ... President boy
 Lee Won-jong ... Big Razor Sis
 Lee Jae-yong ... Teacher
 Park Jae-woong ... Soccer captain
 Yoo Ho-rin ... some girl / Hare Krishna
 Kim Yoo-bin ... noodle boy
 Kim Do-yeon ... female gangster / last naive girl
 Lee Byung-joon
 Kim Han-joon ... kidnapper
 Kim Ha-kyun
 Moon Won-joo as Gangster
 Kim Soo-mi ... cameo
 Han Eun-sun ... 
 Yong Yi ... riverside lover
 Jang Joon-nyung ... number 2 / chief guard
 Jo Jung-rin

Awards and nominations
2006 Blue Dragon Film Awards
 Nomination – Best Art Direction – Lee Hyeong-ju

2007 Baeksang Arts Awards
 Nomination – Best Director – E J-yong

References

External links 
 
 
 
 

2006 films
2000s teen comedy films
South Korean sex comedy films
Films based on manhwa
Films directed by E J-yong
2000s Korean-language films
Live-action films based on comics
Lotte Entertainment films
2006 comedy films
2000s South Korean films